Damian Curtis Johnson (born December 18, 1962) is a former professional American football player who played offensive lineman for five seasons for the New York Giants and the New England Patriots.

Damian Johnson was convicted of theft in April 2009 in a New Jersey court. Sonita Johnson, had testified her husband simply came home one day and told her the Mercedes she leased for his use had been stolen.

Johnson currently owns and operates a transportation company in Michigan known as Giant Transportation.

References

1962 births
Living people
People from Great Bend, Kansas
Players of American football from Kansas
American football offensive linemen
Kansas State Wildcats football players
New York Giants players
New England Patriots players